John Henry "Harry" Deane (May 6, 1846 – May 31, 1925) was an American professional baseball player born in Trenton, New Jersey.  He mostly played center field in his two season career in the National Association.  He played in six games while managing five for the  Fort Wayne Kekiongas, and 46 games for the  Baltimore Canaries.

Career
In 1870, Deane was substitute player for the famous Cincinnati Red Stockings. When the team's biggest star George Wright injured his knee and missed 16 games, Deane played Andy Leonard's outfield position while the latter replaced Wright at shortstop.

The Fort Wayne team joined the new National Association in 1871, an organization made of all-professional teams from around the country. He played in six games, batting .182, playing all of his games in Left Field. After just 14 games into the season, and 5–9 record, Bill Lennon was relieved of his on field command, and Harry replaced him, finishing the final games the team played with a 2–3 record.

Harry joined the Baltimore Canaries in 1874, playing the majority of his time in Center Field. He finished the season with a .246 batting average in 47 games played.

Post-career
Harry died at the age of 79 in Indianapolis, Indiana, and was buried at Crown Hill Cemetery.

References

External links

19th-century baseball players
Baseball players from Trenton, New Jersey
Major League Baseball center fielders
Baseball player-managers
Cincinnati Red Stockings players
Fort Wayne Kekiongas players
Fort Wayne Kekiongas managers
Baltimore Canaries players
Burials at Crown Hill Cemetery
1846 births
1925 deaths